A Littoral Response Group (LRG) is a Royal Navy task group consisting of at least two amphibious warfare ships, a company of Royal Marines and supporting elements primarily tasked with amphibious warfare from the littoral areas. They were first deployed in 2020 and have been described by the Royal Navy as being more flexible and agile compared to previous amphibious task groups with an emphasis on forward-basing, precision strike capabilities, high mobility, modern command and control technology, networked autonomous systems and deception capabilities. Multiple LRGs can combine to form a more substantial Littoral Strike Group (LSG) and they can also join a UK Carrier Strike Group to form an Expeditionary Strike Force.

Background 

The LRG concept responds to a global shift in interstate competition from total wars to persistence through limited positional warfare. It also responds to the proliferation of anti-ship missiles, man-portable air-defence systems (MANPADS) and sophisticated ISR capabilities which have rendered traditional large-scale amphibious assaults increasingly hazardous. This has made them an unattractive option to seize and take control of ground in the littoral zone, an area of increased importance due to the rise in population centres and economic interests in those areas.

Whilst the LRG concept was first announced in 2019, the Royal Navy has deployed similar task groups over the past decade as part of the Response Force Task Group, Joint Rapid Reaction Force and UK Joint Expeditionary Force. The LRG, however, is unique in that it is designed to be forward-based and centred around the Future Commando Force.

The first LRG was deployed on an experimental deployment in September 2020, named LRG(X), which took place in Cyprus. The LSG trailed 40 experimental concepts, including the use of drones to resupply equipment to commandos on the ground.

Overview

Role

The LRG concept provides the UK options in an era of sub-threshold competition, a "grey zone" where nation states and actors compete in a hostile manner using tactics below the threshold of war. They can be used to carry out raiding missions, demonstrations of force, evacuations and precision strikes inland from the littoral zone.

The Royal United Services Institute provided four example uses for a Royal Navy LRG in its publication, titled Requirements for the UK’s Amphibious Forces in the Future Operating Environment, which are:
 The removal of a Russian force that has landed on the Norwegian archipelago of Svalbard to prevent the installation of area denial (A2AD) systems.
 A reinforcement to prevent the seizure of Gotland, Åland or Bornholm in the Baltic by Russia.
 The seizure of the Iranian island of Abu Musa in the Strait of Hormuz to prevent mine-laying and attacks on commercial shipping by the Iranians.
 Intervention in Hodeidah, Yemen to prevent a humanitarian catastrophe and reduce the threat to shipping in the Red Sea.

Composition 
In 2021, the Ministry of Defence announced it would be investing £50 million into upgrading one of the Bay-class landing ship docks to better facilitate its role within the LRG concept, with upgrades to its command and control facilities and the installation of a permament hangar. This was to have been a stopgap solution until the entry into service of the new Multi-Role Support Ships (MRSS) in the 2030s. However, in July 2022, it was reported that the future Littoral Strike role would be assumed by RFA Argus after a refit to convert her. Escort will be provided by at least one frigate or destroyer.

Fixed and rotary-wing remotely-piloted air systems (RPAS) are an integral part of the LRG concept. These systems provide commandos with increased strike, surveillance and logistical options, increasing their lethality, survivability and sustainability.

Operational history 
The Royal Navy has one operational LRG, Littoral Response Group (North), which is based in Europe. It has plans for a second to be based in the Indo-Pacific from 2023.

Littoral Response Group (North) 

Littoral Response Group (North) is the lead formation, based in Europe, with an area of responsibility in the Atlantic, Baltic and Mediterranean. It was first deployed in March 2021 on a three-month mission to the North Atlantic and Baltic Sea and took part in NATO's BALTOPS large-scale military exercise. In May, the same task group then participated in Exercise Ragnar Viking alongside the US Navy's  amphibious ready group in Norway. Prior to this, both groups carried out joint amphibious drills in Scotland as part of Exercise Wader. 29 Commando Regiment Royal Artillery, 24 Commando Royal Engineers and the Commando Logistics Regiment supported this deployment. Both task groups also joined the UK Carrier Strike Group led by the aircraft carrier  for Exercise Strike Warrior. The exercise involved 20 ships, three submarines and 84 aircraft and validated NATO's ability to coordinate a carrier strike group with an amphibious task group.

Argus provided the task group enhanced medical facilities and a flight deck with  Merlin and Wildcat helicopters.

In March 2023, the Royal Navy established a base in Norway for LRG(N) personnel, named Camp Viking. It will be used to respond to emerging crises in Europe.

Littoral Response Group (South) 
Littoral Response Group (South), when formed in 2023, will be based at the UK Joint Logistics Support Base in Duqm, Oman with responsibility for the Indo-Pacific. The commando element will be provided by 40 Commando Royal Marines who carried out pre-deployment training in the Mojave Desert in October 2021 in order to prepare them for their role. They trained alongside Dutch Marines who will also be providing part of the LRG. The Commando Logistic Regiment, 30 Commando Information Exploitation Group, 24 Commando Royal Engineers and 29 Commando Royal Artillery will also be providing elements. In total, the task group will comprise approximately 500 British troops and 120 Dutch troops.

References 

Naval units and formations of the United Kingdom
Expeditionary units and formations